The MPK-213 was a  in the Soviet Navy and later Russian Navy.

Specifications 

Developed in the GDR by specialists from the Zelenodolsk shipyard, Captain 2nd Rank O.K. Korobkov was appointed the main observer from the Navy on the project. For the GDR Navy, 16 ships were built (in Germany, Project 133.1, Parchim), the head MPK entered service in 1981. In 1992, all ships of the Project 133.1 were sold to Indonesia. For the USSR Navy, they were built according to the 1331M Project, after the collapse of the USSR, all ships were transferred to the Russian Navy. The modernized version was distinguished by updated artillery, hydroacoustic and radio-technical weapons.

Project 133.1 was developed on the basis of the IPC Project 1124 Albatross in the German Democratic Republic (GDR) with the help of specialists from the Zelenodolsk shipyard for the Navy of the National People's Army of the GDR and the Warsaw Pact countries, as well as for export sales.

Project 1331M was designed in the German Democratic Republic with the technical assistance of the Zelenodolsk Design Bureau for the USSR Navy, this project is a development of Project 133.1 and differs from it in the composition of weapons and navigation equipment.

Construction and career 
MPK-213 was laid down on 8 April 1986 at Peene-Werft, Wolgast. Launched on 28 February 1987 and commissioned on 29 July 1988 into the Baltic Fleet.

The ship was decommissioned on 28 May 2004 and was later scrapped.

Pennant numbers

Citations 

Ships built in East Germany
1987 ships
Parchim-class corvettes